Maria-Cristina Borba-Dias (born 26 June 1951) is a Brazilian former professional tennis player.

Borba-Dias competed at the 1968 French Open and on the same trip represented the Brazil Federation Cup team in a tie against Australia at Roland Garros. Brazil were outmatched by the Australians, who would go on to win the title, with Borba-Dias losing to Kerry Melville in the singles, then to Melville and Margaret Court in the doubles.

References

External links
 
 

1951 births
Living people
Brazilian female tennis players